Faz or FAZ may refer to:

People 
 Fahrudin Kuduzović (born 1984), Bosnian footballer
 Faz Husain (1952–2006), American politician
 Owen Farrell (born 1991), English rugby union player
 Feliks Zemdegs (born 1995), Australian speedcuber
 Irving Fazola (1912–1949), American jazz clarinetist
 Roberto Faz (1914–1966), Cuban singer

Other uses 
 Faz, Iran, a village in Razavi Khorasan Province
 Fasa Airport, in Iran
 Fazakerley railway station, in England
 Football Association of Zambia
 Frankfurter Allgemeine Zeitung, a German newspaper
 Northwestern Fars language, of Iran, probably misclassified 
 Zairian Armed Forces, the former regular army of Zaire